Myer is both a surname and a given name. Notable people with the name include:

Surname:
Albert J. Myer (1828–1880), American Army officer and surgeon considered the father of the Army Signal Corps and the US Weather Bureau
Buddy Myer (1904–1974), All Star major league baseball second baseman
Edmund J. Myer (1846–1934), American teacher of singing
Horatio Myer (1850–1916), British businessman and Member of Parliament
Ken Myer (1921–1992), American-born Australian philanthropist and businessman
Sidney Myer (1878–1934), businessman who co-founded the Australian department store chain; father of Ken Myer
Val Myer (1883–1959), British architect and portrait painter

Given name:
Myer Fredman (born 1932), British-Australian conductor
Myer Galpern (1903–1993), British Labour Party politician
Myer Horowitz (born 1932) Canadian academic and former president of the University of Alberta
Myer Lyon (c. 1750 – 1797), tenor opera singer in London and Dublin
Myer Prinstein (1878–1924), American long jump and triple jump Olympic champion
Myer Rosenblum (1907–2002), Australian rugby union player and lawyer
Myer Skoog (born 1927), American retired National Basketball Association player
Myer Strouse (1825–1878), Democratic member of the US House of Representatives from Pennsylvania
Prince Myer, the player character in the video game Deadly Towers

Jewish given names
Jewish surnames
Yiddish-language surnames